Cretan Airlines was a short-lived airline based in Heraklion, Greece that operated from 1993
to 1995. It is not to be confused with Cretan Airways, an airline also based in Heraklion, that never started revenue flights.

Code data
IATA Code: C5
ICAO Code: KRT
Callsign: Cretan

History
Cretan Airlines was established in 1993 by Cretan businessmen active in the 
tourist sector. Their aim was to run an airline for flying tourists to airports
nearby their hotels. Cretan was the first Greek airline to operate Airbus
A320 aircraft that were leased from Adria Airways. 
Although the main business  was charter flights, a route from Thessaloniki to Athens
and Crete was opened. Cretan also planned opening other domestic routes and a decision to
order the Dornier Do-328 was made. Unfortunately, load
factors during the winter months proved to be too low, thus incurring great
economic losses for the company. Therefore, its owners were forced to cease
operations in early 1995. At that time, the company had transported more
than 100.000 passengers and had a staff of approximately 250 people.

Services

Cretan Airlines operated scheduled services between Crete and cities in Germany, Italy and France.

Fleet

The fleet of Cretan Airlines consisted of five Airbus A320 aircraft:
SX-BAS (S5-AAA)
SX-BAT (S5-AAB)
SX-BAU (S5-AAC)
SX-BAX (N431LF, TC-ONG and N316DA)
SX-

References

External links

Cretan Airlines history
Cretan Airlines aircraft photos from Airliners.net

Defunct airlines of Greece
Airlines established in 1993
Airlines disestablished in 1995
Greek companies established in 1993